Cymbopogon refractus, commonly known as barbed wire grass, is a species of perennial grass in the genus Cymbopogon of the family Poaceae. It is native to Australia.

Description
Cymbopogon refractus is a tufted perennial bunchgrass, without stolons or rhizomes. The nodes are purplish and hairless. 

The leaves of the plant are basal and on the stems. The leaf is hairless and when crushed gives off a lemon-ginger scent like other grasses in the genus Cymbopogon.

The spikelets are paired, one stalked the other unstalked. Flowering mostly spring to autumn.

Taxonomy
Cymbopogon refractus was first described by R. Brown in 1810 as Andropogon refractus, but in 1921 was placed in the genus Cymbopogon by Camus.

Habitat and ecology
Cymbopogon refractus is widespread on poor soils of roadsides, native pastures, woodlands and forests  of Queensland, New South Wales, the Northern Territory, and Victoria. C. refractus is very drought tolerant but readily frosted.

References

Bunchgrasses of Australasia
Endemic flora of Australia
Poales of Australia
refractus